Hugh Hesketh Hughes (October 1902 – 23 May 1940) was a Welsh champion polo player who trained in Argentina.

Biography
He was born in October 1902 in Flintshire, Wales. He participated in the 1936 International Polo Cup. He was a second lieutenant in the Welsh Guards during World War II and was killed on 23 May 1940 in France. He is buried in the St. Martin-Boulogne Communal Cemetery.

References 

1902 births
1940 deaths
Welsh polo players
International Polo Cup
Sportspeople from Flintshire
Welsh Guards officers
British Army personnel killed in World War II
Military personnel from Flintshire